K.W. Electronics was a British manufacturer of amateur radio equipment founded in the mid 1950s by the late Rowley Shears G8KW. It was based in Dartford, Kent, and manufactured a wide range of high frequency band receivers, transmitters and accessory equipment. The company was taken over by DECCA and subsequently ceased production during the 1970s.

Products
 KW Vanguard transmitter
 KW Valiant transmitter
 KW Viceroy SSB transmitter
 KW Vespa SSB transmitter
 KW 76 receiver
 KW 77 receiver
 KW 103 SWR meter
 KW 107 Supermatch ATU (antenna tuning unit) 
 KW 108 Monitor scope
 KW 109 High power version of KW 107
 KW 110 Q multiplier
 KW 160 transmitter NB KW 160 was also the designation for a 160 meter Aerial Matching Unit.
 KW 201 receiver
 KW 202 receiver
 KW 204 transmitter
 KW 600 linear amplifier
 KW 1000 linear amplifier
 KW 2000 transceiver
 KW Atlanta transceiver
 KW PEP METER

References

Electronics companies of the United Kingdom
Amateur radio companies
Companies based in Kent
Defunct manufacturing companies of the United Kingdom
Radio manufacturers